Glenside is a census-designated place (CDP) located in Cheltenham Township and Abington Township in Montgomery County, Pennsylvania, United States. It borders Northwest Philadelphia. The population was 7,737 at the 2020 census on a land area of  1.3 square miles. Glenside is most notable for its entertainment, such as the Keswick Theatre, restaurants, recreational facilities and parks. The Glenside station is one of the busiest in the SEPTA system. Glenside is located approximately six miles from Center City Philadelphia.

History
A railroad station called Tacony Station was erected in 1855, named for Tacony Creek, which flows through the settlement. It was later called Abington Station.  Glenside Post Office opened in 1888, and the railroad station was renamed Glenside station.

The Glenside Fire Company was established in 1900, and firefighting equipment was stored in a building until a firehouse was erected in 1907.

Glenside had two public schools: Glenside students living in Abington Township attended The Weldon School, and students in Cheltenham Township attended Glenside School, built in 1908. Glenside School was demolished in the 1960s.

In the early 1900s, Glenside had a "thriving business district" along Easton Road. A bank, Glenside National Bank, opened in 1909.

Geography

Glenside is split into two townships: Abington Township, and Cheltenham Township, with the latter being where the following are located: United States Post Office, Glenside Library, and Glenside Memorial Hall.

Climate 
Glenside has a typical Northeast climate. The following is a chart of the average temperatures in Glenside.

Demographics

As of the 2020 census, the CDP was 91.0% White, 5.3% Black or African American, 1.0% Asian, and 1.6% were two or more races.

As of the 2010 census, the CDP was 85.4% White, 7.2% Black or African American, 0.2% Native American, 2.8% Asian, 1.0% were Some Other Race, and 1.7% were two or more races. 2.9% of the population were of Hispanic or Latino ancestry.

As of the census of 2000, there were 7,914 people, 3,103 households, and 2,013 families residing in the CDP. The population density was 6,217.4 people per square mile (2,406.0/km2). There were 3,181 housing units at an average density of 2,499.1/sq mi (967.1/km2). The racial makeup of the CDP was 88.97% White, 6.66% African American, 0.10% Native American, 3.02% Asian, 0.03% Pacific Islander, 0.27% from other races, and 0.96% from two or more races. Hispanic or Latino of any race were 1.44% of the population.

There were 3,103 households, out of which 31.3% had children under the age of 18 living with them, 52.7% were married couples living together, 9.2% had a female householder with no husband present, and 35.1% were non-families. 28.8% of all households were made up of individuals, and 9.7% had someone living alone who was 65 years of age or older. The average household size was 2.54 and the average family size was 3.21.

In the CDP, the population was spread out, with 25.0% under the age of 18, 8.0% from 18 to 24, 30.8% from 25 to 44, 22.3% from 45 to 64, and 13.8% who were 65 years of age or older. The median age was 36 years. For every 100 females, there were 91.3 males. For every 100 females age 18 and over, there were 87.3 males.

The median income for a household in the CDP was $58,868, and the median income for a family was $74,025. Males had a median income of $48,378 versus $35,629 for females. The per capita income for the CDP was $26,393. About 1.6% of families and 3.4% of the population were below the poverty line, including 2.4% of those under age 18 and 3.6% of those age 65 or over.

Economy
Newgrounds, an entertainment website, is headquartered in Glenside.

Arts and culture

Independence Day Parade 
The annual Independence Day parade held in Glenside was founded in 1904.

Points of interest 
Glenside Free Library, established in 1928.
Keswick Theatre, built in 1928, hosts entertainers and shows. It was added to the National Register of Historic Places in 1983.
Keswick Village, a cultural hub and center of commerce.
Downtown has businesses and restaurants.
Glenside Memorial Hall, dedicated to World War I veterans, can accommodate up to 180 people. It was listed on the National Register of Historic Places in 2004.

Parks and recreation
Parks include Harry Renninger Park, Grove Park, and Penbryn Park.
Glenside Pool was reconstructed in 1967.

Education

Cheltenham Township School District operates one school in Glenside, Glenside Elementary. Abington School District operates one school in Glenside, Copper Beech Elementary.

Saint Luke Catholic School in Glenside is a parochial school, part of St. Luke The Evangelist Roman Catholic Church, with approximately 315 students in 2019.

Westminster Theological Seminary, is a Protestant theological seminary in Glenside.

Media
Glenside is served by two weekly newspapers: Times Chronicle and Glenside News, both papers a division of Montgomery News.

Infrastructure

Transportation

SEPTA 
Glenside is served by SEPTA Regional Railroad at the Glenside Train Station. The station, originally known as Abington Station, has its roots back with the North Pennsylvania Railroad and the Reading Railroad. Glenside is also served by SEPTA buses.

Roads 
 Pennsylvania Route 73; in Glenside, it is known as Church Road.
 Pennsylvania Route 309
 Pennsylvania Route 152

Notable people
Johnny Callison, professional baseball player for Philadelphia Phillies and Chicago Cubs
George Castle, son of J.R. Castle, lacrosse player for Philadelphia Wings
J.R. Castle, former lacrosse player
Clay Dalrymple, professional baseball player for Philadelphia Phillies and Baltimore Orioles
Madeleine Dean, United States Congresswoman
Tony Donatelli, soccer player for Charleston Battery
Ray Ellis, artist
Bill Hyndman, amateur golfer
Florence LaRue, singer and original member of the 5th Dimension, lived in Glenside for awhile when she was young.
Peter Lillback, theologian who is President and Professor of Historical Theology and Church History at Westminster Theological Seminary
Jillian Mele, host at Fox News
Jerry Oleksiak, Pennsylvania Secretary of Labor and Industry
Bob Perkins, radio host at WRTI
Jesse Purnell, professional baseball player for Philadelphia Phillies
Russell Swan, Survivor contestant
Richard Ward, actor
George Wilson, College Football Hall of Fame football player
Mike Siani, professional baseball player for Cincinnati Reds

References

External links

Greater Glenside Chamber of Commerce

Census-designated places in Montgomery County, Pennsylvania
Census-designated places in Pennsylvania
Cheltenham Township, Pennsylvania